King Ling of Zhou, personal name  Ji Xiexin, was the twenty-third king of the Chinese Zhou dynasty and the eleventh of Eastern Zhou. He died in 545 BC. 

In the twenty-first year of his reign, Confucius was born.

His successor was his son King Jĭng of Zhou.

His other son was the Crown prince Ji Jin (姬晉). Empress Wu Zetian claimed that her lover Zhang Changzong was a reincarnation of Ji Jin.

Ancestor of the Taiyuan Wang

During the Tang dynasty the Li family of Zhaojun 赵郡李氏, the Cui family of Boling 博陵崔氏, the Cui family of Qinghe 清河崔氏, the Lu family of Fanyang 范陽盧氏, the Zheng family of Xingyang 荥阳郑氏, the Wang family of Taiyuan 太原王氏, and the Li family of Longxi 隴西李氏 were the seven noble families among whom marriage was banned by law. 
Moriya Mitsuo wrote a history of the Later Han-Tang period of the Taiyuan Wang. Among the strongest families was the Taiyuan Wang. 
The prohibition on marriage between the clans issued in 659 by the Gaozong Emperor was flouted by the seven families since a woman of the Boling Cui married a member of the Taiyuan Wang, giving birth to the poet Wang Wei. 
He was the son of Wang Chulian who in turn was the son of Wang Zhou. 
The marriages between the families were performed clandestinely after the prohibition was implemented on the seven families by Gaozong. 
The Zhou dynasty King Ling's son Prince Jin is assumed by most to be the ancestor of the Taiyuan Wang. 
The Longmen Wang were a cadet line of the Zhou dynasty descended Taiyuan Wang, and Wang Yan and his grandson Wang Tong hailed from this cadet line. 
Both Buddhist monks and scholars hailed from the Wang family of Taiyuan such as the monk Tanqian. 
The Wang family of Taiyuan included Wang Huan. 
Their status as "Seven Great surnames" became known during Gaozong's rule. 
The Taiyuan Wang family produced Wang Jun who served under Emperor Huai of Jin. 
A Fuzhou based section of the Taiyuan Wang produced the Buddhist monk Baizhang.

Family
Queens:
 Qi Jiang, of the Jiang clan of Qi, possibly a daughter of Duke Ling of Qi; married in 558 BC

Sons:
 First son, Crown Prince Jin, the father of Zongjing, who served as the Minister of Education of Zhou
 Prince Gui (d. 520 BC), ruled as King Jĭng of Zhou from 544–520 BC
 Prince Ningfu (d. 543 BC)

Ancestry

See also
Family tree of ancient Chinese emperors

Notes 

545 BC deaths
Zhou dynasty kings
6th-century BC Chinese monarchs
Year of birth unknown